Tokomaru is a small town in the district of Horowhenua, in the southwestern North Island of New Zealand. It is located 18 kilometres southwest of Palmerston North, and a similar distance northeast of Shannon. The Tokomaru railway station on the North Island Main Trunk was open from 1885 to 1982.

The Tokomaru Steam Engine Museum features a collection of antique steam engine machinery, much of it still operational. The collection includes a 1904 Fowler traction engine, an 1897 Aveling & Porter portable engine and a huge 335 hp Filer & Stowell stationary engine-compressor ex the Imlay Freezing Works, Wanganui. The museum is open by appointment.

Tokomaru has two public reserves, the Tokomaru Domain, which includes a sports field and hall, and Horseshoe Bend reserve.

The town has a locally run combined store and post office.

There are two factories on the outskirts of Tokomaru. One, Stevensons Construction, is still operational and employs many Tokomaru residents. The other is a former dairy factory that is in the process of being renovated.

Demographics

The population of Tokomaru was 534 in the 2018 New Zealand census, an increase of 48 (9.9%) since the 2013 census, and an increase of 75 (16.3%) since the 2006 census. There were 264 males and 267 females, giving a sex ratio of 0.99 males per female. Ethnicities were 447 people  (83.7%) European/Pākehā, 144 (27.0%) Māori, 21 (3.9%) Pacific peoples, and 15 (2.8%) Asian (totals add to more than 100% since people could identify with multiple ethnicities). Of the total population, 147 people  (27.5%) were under 15 years old, 87 (16.3%) were 15–29, 237 (44.4%) were 30–64, and 57 (10.7%) were over 65.

Miranui

Miranui had a population of 1,788 at the 2018 New Zealand census, an increase of 201 people (12.7%) since the 2013 census, and an increase of 255 people (16.6%) since the 2006 census. There were 633 households. There were 909 males and 882 females, giving a sex ratio of 1.03 males per female. The median age was 34.6 years (compared with 37.4 years nationally), with 474 people (26.5%) aged under 15 years, 303 (16.9%) aged 15 to 29, 828 (46.3%) aged 30 to 64, and 189 (10.6%) aged 65 or older.

Ethnicities were 88.1% European/Pākehā, 19.3% Māori, 3.4% Pacific peoples, 3.9% Asian, and 2.5% other ethnicities (totals add to more than 100% since people could identify with multiple ethnicities).

The proportion of people born overseas was 10.2%, compared with 27.1% nationally.

Although some people objected to giving their religion, 58.2% had no religion, 32.2% were Christian, 0.3% were Hindu, 0.2% were Buddhist and 2.3% had other religions.

Of those at least 15 years old, 213 (16.2%) people had a bachelor or higher degree, and 276 (21.0%) people had no formal qualifications. The median income was $36,700, compared with $31,800 nationally. The employment status of those at least 15 was that 759 (57.8%) people were employed full-time, 180 (13.7%) were part-time, and 42 (3.2%) were unemployed.

Education

References

Horowhenua District
Populated places in Manawatū-Whanganui